is a Japanese swimmer, who specialized in freestyle events. He represented his nation Japan at the 2008 Summer Olympics, placing himself in the fourteenth position as a member of the 4 × 200 m freestyle relay team. Matsumoto is a kinesiology graduate, with a minor degree in humanities, at Nihon University in Tokyo.

Matsumoto competed as a member of the Japanese team in the 4 × 200 m freestyle relay at the 2008 Summer Olympics in Beijing. Despite missing out the individual spot in the 200 m freestyle, he managed to place third at the Olympic trials in Tokyo (1:48.97) to earn a selection on the relay team. Teaming with Yasunori Mononobe, Yoshihiro Okumura, and Sho Uchida in heat one, Matsumoto swam the anchor leg to close the race with a split of 1:48.62, but the Japanese team had to settle for seventh place and fourteenth overall in 7:10.31.

References

External links
NBC Olympics Profile

1984 births
Living people
Olympic swimmers of Japan
Swimmers at the 2008 Summer Olympics
Japanese male freestyle swimmers
People from Mito, Ibaraki
21st-century Japanese people